The Rushikulya River is one of the major rivers in the state of Odisha and covers entire catchment area in the districts of Kandhamal and Ganjam of Odisha. The Rushikulya originates at an elevation of about 1000 metres from Daringbadi hills of the Eastern Ghats range. The place from where the river originates, Daringbadi is called the ' Kashmir of Odisha '. The river lies within the geographical coordinates of 19.07 to 20.19 north latitude and 84.01 to 85.06 east longitude. It meets the Bay of Bengal at Puruna Bandha in Ganjam. Its tributaries are the Baghua, the Dhanei, the Badanadi etc. It has no delta as such at its mouth.

River course
The river flows from the Daringbadi hill station in Kandhamal district. In the Ganjam district it flows through Surada, Dharakote, Asika, Pitala, Purusottampur, Taratarini, Pratappur, Alladigam, Brahmapur, Ganjam and the Chhatrapur block. The river is 165 km long with a total catchment area of 7700 km2. The mean monthly flow rate is estimated to be 89.64 cumecs during 1992-93 period under Daily rainfall runoff modelling of Rushikulya river, orissa .

Survey for olive ridley turtles
In 1993, biologists from the Odisha Forest Department and the Wildlife Institute of India learned that large scale nesting of olive ridley sea turtles was taking place near the mouth of the Rushikulya River. This area is the location of one of the largest mass nesting (arribada) sites of olive ridley sea turtles in India. The villages near the mouth are Pali Bandha, Puruna Bandha, Gokhara Kuda and Kantia Pada, where one can find the nesting sites of the olive ridley turtles. These are fishermen's villages.

Urban centres

The city of Brahmapur is situated in the basin and other important towns are Chhatrapur, Ganjam, Aska, Bhanjanagar , Bellaguntha and Surada.

Industries
A number of large scale industries have been set up in the basin. Among them are Grasim Industries Ltd-Ganjam Chemical Division (formerly Jayashree Chemical Ltd). Aska Co-operative Sugar Industries Ltd. Nuagam, Aska Spinning Mills, Monorama Chemical Works Ltd., Orissa Tubes Pvt. Ltd., etc. There are about 3360 numbers of small scale industries of different categories mainly food and allied, forest & wood based, rubber and plastic products and glass and ceramics. There is enough scope for setting up forest based industries. The basin is rich in mineral wealth. The major economic minerals are clay, limestone, manganese, sand talc, black sand and grinding materials.

References

External links

 Government of Orissa

Rivers of Odisha
Rivers of India